Luís Rafael Margaça Garcia Zambujo (born 29 September 1986) is a Portuguese former professional footballer who played as a winger.

Club career
Born in Portel, Évora District, Zambujo played youth football with S.L. Benfica. He made his debut as a professional in 2006 with C.D. Olivais e Moscavide in the Segunda Liga, and alternated between that tier and the third in the following years.

In the summer of 2011, Zambujo signed with Portimonense S.C. of the second division. In January 2013, after a brief spell with fellow league team C.F. Os Belenenses, he returned to his previous club, scoring his first two goals in the competition to help to a 4–0 home win against C.D. Tondela.

References

External links

1986 births
Living people
Portuguese footballers
Association football wingers
Liga Portugal 2 players
Segunda Divisão players
S.L. Benfica B players
C.D. Olivais e Moscavide players
C.D. Aves players
Atlético Clube de Portugal players
Clube Oriental de Lisboa players
S.C. Farense players
Portimonense S.C. players
C.F. Os Belenenses players
Louletano D.C. players
Portugal youth international footballers
Sportspeople from Évora District